The 1994 Dutch Open was an ATP tennis tournament held in Hilversum, Netherlands and played on outdoor clay courts. It was the 36th edition of the tournament and was held from 25 July to 1 August 1994. Unseeded Karel Nováček won his first title of the year, and 13th of his career. It was his 3rd win at Hilversum, having also won in 1989 and 1992.

Finals

Singles

 Karel Nováček defeated  Richard Fromberg, 7–5, 6–4, 7–6(9–7)

Doubles

 Daniel Orsanic /  Jan Siemerink defeated  David Adams /  Andrei Olhovskiy 6–4, 6–2

References

External links
 ITF tournament edition details